Arne Møller (born 6 April 1960) is a Norwegian former professional footballer who played as a midfielder.

Career
Møller played for Helgerød IL, Brann and Aris Thessaloniki.

He earned four caps for the Norwegian national team.

References

1960 births
Living people
Norwegian footballers
Norway international footballers
SK Brann players
Aris Thessaloniki F.C. players
Eliteserien players
Norwegian First Division players
Super League Greece players
Association football midfielders
Norwegian expatriate footballers
Norwegian expatriate sportspeople in Greece
Expatriate footballers in Greece